"Out of Control" is a song by Irish rock band U2. It was the A-side of band's debut single, released as an EP called U2 3, and charted at No. 19 on the Irish Singles Chart.

Song information
"Out of Control" was chosen as the A-side of the U2 3 EP when Irish disk jockey Dave Fanning asked listeners to choose it among the three songs which were to be released on the single. Bono told the Irish magazine Hot Press, in 1979, that the song "is about waking up on your 18th birthday and realizing that you're 18 years old and that the two most important decisions in your life have nothing to do with you - being born and dying." Along with "Stories for Boys", "Out of Control" was one of the two tracks from U2 3 which were re-recorded and included on the album Boy. The 1979 single version is shorter than the re-recorded 1980 album version, with their lengths being respectively 3:52 and 4:14.

Recording history
Unlike the other two songs on the EP, "Out of Control" was a song the band had difficulty recording. During a 24-bar section nearly two-thirds of the way into the song, the instrumentation was supposed to drop out for a "simple bass-drum figure" before building back up again. Drummer Mullen repeatedly lost his timing during this section, causing his bandmates to re-enter the song improperly. De Whalley insisted that the band record take after take until they got it right, as he thought it was their best song and needed to be coherent on record. This caused friction in the studio, particularly with Mullen who Bono said should have been keeping good time, as he had been taking drumming lessons. Eventually, they completed a usable take of "Out of Control". Producer Chas de Whalley realised and stated, in retrospect, that the bass and drums were constantly out of time with each other. He said Clayton had "a slightly different sense of timing from virtually any other musician".

Live performances
"Out of Control" became a relatively popular live track, being played 390 times in total; however, it did not appear on the band's 2019 tour, being played for the last time in 2018.

Other releases
The single version of "Out of Control" was included on the digital download compilation Surrender: 40 Songs, One Playlist. A re-recorded acoustic version appears on the first disc of the 2023 album of acoustic U2 re-recordings Songs of Surrender.

Chart

References

1980 songs
U2 songs
Songs written by Bono
Songs written by the Edge
Songs written by Adam Clayton
Songs written by Larry Mullen Jr.